The 2011–12 season are the Saba Qom Football Club's 8th season in the Iran Pro League, and their 8th consecutive season in the top division of Iranian football. They are also competing in the Hazfi Cup and 10th year in existence as a football club.

Club

Coaching staff

Other personnel

Grounds

Kit 

|
|
|}

Player

First team squad

Transfers 
Confirmed transfers 2011–12

Summer 

In:

Out:

Winter 

In:

Out:

Competitions

Overview

Iran Pro League

Standings

Results summary

Results by round

Matches

Hazfi Cup

Matches

Friendly Matches

Statistics

Appearances

Top scorers
Includes all competitive matches. The list is sorted by shirt number when total goals are equal.

Last updated on 22 February 2011

Friendlies and Pre season goals are not recognized as competitive match goals.

Top assistors
Includes all competitive matches. The list is sorted by shirt number when total assistors are equal.

Last updated on 22 February 2011

Friendlies and Pre season goals are not recognized as competitive match assist.

Disciplinary record
Includes all competitive matches. Players with 1 card or more included only.

Last updated on 22 February 2011

Goals conceded 
 Updated on 21 May 2011

Matches played 
 Updated on 2 April 2011

Own goals 
 Updated on 2 April 2011

See also
 2011–12 Persian Gulf Cup
 2011–12 Hazfi Cup

References

External links
Iran Premier League Statistics
Persian League

2011-12
Iranian football clubs 2011–12 season